Dalal Bruchmann is an Austrian musician, recording artist, composer and actress.

Career 

Bruchmann is a longtime musician having attended the Broadway Connection music school at the age of 12. Her debut single "Taste the Night" was released digitally in 2011, including remixes from Tony Moran. A video was shot in Los Angeles and premiered on AOL Music the same year. After being added to YouTube, the video was viewed over 1.2 million times.

Bruchmann performed "Taste the Night" at the 2012 New York Fashion Week, Couture Fashion Week in New York and the Fender Music Lodge at Sundance Film Festival.

In 2014, Bruchmann released the single "Suddenly". The song was played on the radio in the United States, Australia, Canada, United Kingdom and Germany.

Bruchmann's single "Superman" was written with Nate "Impact" Jolley for the film Hair: A Documentary in 2015. The song was later nominated for a Hollywood Music in Media Award in the "Best Song - Documentary" category.

Bruchmann released a contemporary classical EP The Quiet Heart on October 13, 2017 through The Orchard, a subsidiary of Sony Music. Dalal is the solo artist on the project EINAUDI, playing compositions by renowned Italian composer Ludovico Einaudi for Warner Classics. The first single "Einaudi: Nuvole Bianche" has been released on June 29, 2018, followed by a second single on July 20, 2018 titled "Einaudi: Le Onde".

Bruchmann currently lives in Los Angeles and works in both in England and the United States. Her ancestor Franz von Bruchmann was a lyricist for Franz Schubert.

Discography
Albums
 2018: The 50 Greatest Einaudi Pieces – Label: Warner Classics
 2019: The Einaudi Sound – Label: Warner Classics
 2019: Indigo Valley Original Motion Picture Soundtrack – Label: Gold Eagle Entertainment LLC

Singles
 2011: "Taste the Night" – Label: Ingrooves / Universal Music
 2014: "Suddenly" – Label: Gold Eagle Entertainment LLC
 2014: "Superman" – Label: Gold Eagle Entertainment LLC
 2018: "Einaudi: Nuvole Bianche" – Label: Warner Classics
 2018: "Einaudi: Divenire" – Label: Warner Classics
 2018: "Einaudi: Le Onde" – Label: Warner Classics
 2018: "Einaudi: Una Mattina" – Label: Warner Classics
 2018: "Einaudi: I Giorni" – Label: Warner Classics
 2018: "Einaudi: Fly" – Label: Warner Classics
 2020: "An Old Fashioned Mystery" – Label: Gold Eagle Entertainment LLC
 2020: "A Precipice of Lamplight" – Label: Gold Eagle Entertainment LLC

EPs
 2017: The Quiet Heart – Label: The Orchard / Sony Music

Film Music
 2015: Hair (Documentary) – Composer
 2016: First Comes Like – Composer
 2019: Indigo Valley – Composer
 2019: Beyond Moving – Composer
 2019: Hurt By Paradise – Composer
 2019: The Shot – Composer

Filmography

External links

References

Austrian film actresses
Austrian television actresses
English-language singers from Austria
Austrian emigrants to the United States
Living people
Place of birth missing (living people)
1987 births
21st-century Austrian women  singers